Walter of Liederkerque was a Flemish knight (from Liedekerke) who, along with his older brother Engilbert, accompanied their uncle Florent of Hainaut to the Peloponnese in southern Greece, following Florent's proclamation as Prince of Achaea in 1289. There he was named governor of Corinth and its surrounding region. 

Walter carried on an extravagant lifestyle, which left him short of funds. In a famous incident, recorded in the Chronicle of the Morea, he imprisoned a Greek magnate called Photios in hopes of forcing him to ransom his freedom for 10,000 hyperpyra. In the end, Photios secured his liberty by paying 1,000 hyperpyra, but the injustice rankled. A short time after, in 1295, Photios met a Frankish lord, Guy of Charpigny, on his way and, mistaking him for Walter, he killed him.

References

Sources
 

13th-century births
13th-century people from the Principality of Achaea
People from Flemish Brabant
Medieval Corinthia
Year of death unknown
Year of birth unknown